Honey in the Rock is the third studio album by American musician Charlie Daniels, released in 1973, appearing on the record label Kama Sutra Records. It was re-released on Epic Records in 1976 under the title Uneasy Rider.

Track listing

Personnel
 Charlie Daniels - guitar, banjo, mandolin, vocals
 Joel DiGregorio - piano, organ, backing vocals
 Earl Grigsby - bass, backing vocals
 Buddy Davis - drums, bongos
 Fred Edwards - drums, congas
Technical
Neil Wilburn - engineer
Ruby Mazur - photography, design

Chart performance
Honey in the Rock peaked at number 164 on the Billboard 200 chart.

References

1973 albums
Charlie Daniels albums
Kama Sutra Records albums